Zahra Cheeseman (born 8 November 2002) is an English-born Moroccan footballer who plays as a goalkeeper for  American college team Colorado College Tigers and the Morocco women's national team.

Early life
Cheeseman was raised in Haywards Heath. Her father is English and her mother is Moroccan.

College career
Cheeseman has attended the Colorado College in the United States.

Club career 
Cheeseman is a Brighton product. She was also in the Charlton academy. She joined Lewes in 2020.

International career
Cheeseman made her senior debut for Morocco on 14 June 2021 in a 3–2 friendly home win over Mali.

See also
List of Morocco women's international footballers

References

External links 

2002 births
Living people
Citizens of Morocco through descent
Moroccan women's footballers
Women's association football goalkeepers
Colorado College Tigers women's soccer players
Morocco women's international footballers
Moroccan expatriate footballers
Moroccan expatriate sportspeople in the United States
Expatriate women's soccer players in the United States
Moroccan people of English descent
People from Haywards Heath
Footballers from West Sussex
English women's footballers
Brighton & Hove Albion W.F.C. players
Charlton Athletic W.F.C. players
Lewes F.C. Women players
English expatriate women's footballers
English expatriate sportspeople in the United States
English people of Moroccan descent
English sportspeople of African descent